Kicker (stylized in all lowercase) is Germany's leading sports magazine, focused primarily on football. The magazine was founded in 1920 by German football pioneer Walther Bensemann and is published twice weekly, usually Monday and Thursday. Each edition sells around 80,000 copies. Kicker is a founding member of European Sports Media, an association of football publications.

Kicker annually awards the most prolific scorer of the Bundesliga with the Kicker Torjägerkanone award. It is equivalent to the Pichichi Trophy in Spanish football.

The magazine also publishes an almanac, the Kicker Fußball-Almanach. It was first published from 1937 to 1942, and then continuously from 1959 to date. They also publish a yearbook (Kicker Fußball-Jahrbuch).

History 

Kicker was first issued in July 1920 in Konstanz, Germany. The magazine's headquarters were originally in Stuttgart before relocating to Nuremberg in 1926. During World War II, the magazine merged with the publication Fußball, and was eventually discontinued in fall 1944. After the war, the magazine was again published (under the name Sport) by the newly incorporated Olympia-Verlag publishing company. Former chief editor Friedebert Becker again began publishing Kicker in 1951, and for a number of years, both Kicker and Sport appeared at the same time. In 1966, Kicker was sold to Axel Springer AG. In 1968, Olympia-Verlag in Nuremberg acquired Kicker and merged it with Sportmagazin, which had been published twice weekly since 1952. The first issue of the newly founded Kicker-Sportmagazin was released on 7 October 1968. Beside the two weekly publications, Kicker provides a digital edition since 2012. The online version of kicker.de offers a broad live ticker for over 80 different international leagues. The magazine has three apps in the iTunes store.

Magazine 
The modern version of Kicker covers a number of sporting competitions and events, including:

 The German Bundesliga, 2. Bundesliga, 3. Liga, and Regionalliga
 The German DFB-Pokal
 The Germany national team and Germany women's national football team
 The German Women's Bundesliga
 Various European leagues and competitions, including the Premier League, La Liga, Serie A, and Ligue 1
 Various international football leagues
 Formula One racing
 The Olympic Games
 eSports and competitive video gaming
 Various other sporting events, depending on on-going competitions

Kicker Sportmagazin Club of the Century 

In 1998, Kicker published a list of the best football clubs of the 20th century. The list was based on the opinions of former players and managers (Giovanni Trapattoni, Johan Cruyff, Udo Lattek, Just Fontaine etc.). Each of them could name their choice for the five greatest teams and provide arguments in support thereof. Not all them stuck to the allotted number of picks. For example, Johan Cruyff picked three teams instead - Ajax, Milan and Dynamo Kyiv.

Each club's trophies and Ballon d'Or winners are shown up until 1999

Greatest Clubs (1863–2014) 

In 2014, the magazine created a new list of the best clubs in history. This time it was formed based on the opinions of the magazine's editors. The list was based on criteria as the clubs' history, achievements at international stage, titles won and the career of its own players. In the Top 10, three teams represented Germany.

References

External links
 

Association football magazines
Sports magazines published in Germany
Football mass media in Germany
Magazines established in 1920
Mass media in Nuremberg
Magazines published in Stuttgart
Biweekly magazines published in Germany
German-language magazines
German news websites
1920 establishments in Germany